Half Moon Bay, an affluent coastal suburb of Auckland, New Zealand, lies immediately south of Bucklands Beach. It formed part of Manukau City until the amalgamation of the entire Auckland Region in 2010 under one governing authority, Auckland Council.

It is well known for the Half Moon Bay Marina, home to over 500 boats. It is located on the Tamaki Estuary in the Hauraki Gulf.

Half Moon Bay is the location of a long-established ferry terminal for vehicle and passenger traffic to Waiheke Island and for a regular passenger ferry service to downtown Auckland.

Demographics

Half Moon Bay had a population of 8,106 at the 2018 New Zealand census, an increase of 300 people (3.8%) since the 2013 census, and an increase of 681 people (9.2%) since the 2006 census. There were 2,604 households, comprising 4,074 males and 4,035 females, giving a sex ratio of 1.01 males per female, with 1,602 people (19.8%) aged under 15 years, 1,572 (19.4%) aged 15 to 29, 3,861 (47.6%) aged 30 to 64, and 1,074 (13.2%) aged 65 or older.

Ethnicities were 50.8% European/Pākehā, 5.0% Māori, 3.6% Pacific peoples, 44.3% Asian, and 3.2% other ethnicities. People may identify with more than one ethnicity.

The percentage of people born overseas was 52.1, compared with 27.1% nationally.

Although some people chose not to answer the census's question about religious affiliation, 49.9% had no religion, 34.2% were Christian, 0.3% had Māori religious beliefs, 2.8% were Hindu, 1.9% were Muslim, 2.7% were Buddhist and 2.8% had other religions.

Of those at least 15 years old, 2,037 (31.3%) people had a bachelor's or higher degree, and 753 (11.6%) people had no formal qualifications. 1,401 people (21.5%) earned over $70,000 compared to 17.2% nationally. The employment status of those at least 15 was that 3,174 (48.8%) people were employed full-time, 930 (14.3%) were part-time, and 228 (3.5%) were unemployed.

History

Prior to the construction of the marina complex in 1967 the muddy bay was known first as Hancock's Bay, after the Hancock family which farmed in the area, and then as Camp Bay due to the establishment of the King George V Health Camp. Beneath the sandy top layer was a deep layer of fine quality pottery clay that was collected for the Pakuranga College art department and stored under the art department building in 1967.

The temporary edges of the land fill were created with the concrete debris from the old Panmure Bridge which was demolished at the time the land fill was being created. Prior to the establishment of the marina the bay was very isolated with only eight houses and the Half Moon Bay Health Camp on the southwest headland.

Education

References

External links
Photographs of Half Moon Bay held in Auckland Libraries' heritage collections.

Suburbs of Auckland
Populated places on the Tāmaki River
Bays of the Auckland Region
Howick Local Board Area